Luis Erberto Bedoya Giraldo (born 1959) is a Colombian former football administrator. He is a former member of the FIFA Council. In May 2016, Bedoya was banned for life by the FIFA Ethics Committee for racketeering and wire fraud .

References

FIFA officials
1959 births
Living people